Epping Stadium is an Australian soccer ground on Harvest Home Rd in Epping, a suburb of Melbourne, Victoria. The stadium has a capacity of 10,000, with approximately 1000 seats in its sole grandstand. The venue was host to several National Soccer League matches during the final days of Carlton SC, and has also hosted A-League clubs Melbourne Heart and Melbourne Victory in pre-season matches, as well as W-League Matches and National Youth League matches.
The stadium will be host to  Melbourne Victory Youth home matches for the 2016 NPL Victoria season.

External links

Soccer venues in Melbourne
Sports venues in Melbourne
Buildings and structures in the City of Whittlesea
Sport in the City of Whittlesea